The Dead Cambridge River is a  river in northwestern Maine.  It is a tributary of Lake Umbagog, the outflow of which is the Androscoggin River, flowing to the tidal Kennebec River and the Atlantic Ocean.

See also
List of rivers of Maine

References

Maine Streamflow Data from the USGS
Maine Watershed Data From Environmental Protection Agency

Tributaries of the Kennebec River
Rivers of Maine
Rivers of Oxford County, Maine